Donald Sherman Oakes (born July 22, 1938) is a former American football player who played offensive tackle.  He played college football for Virginia Tech where his accomplishments led to his induction into the Virginia Tech Sports Hall of Fame.  Professionally, he played two seasons for the National Football League's Philadelphia Eagles and six seasons for the American Football League's  Boston Patriots. After retiring from professional football, Oakes became a high school coach in his hometown of Roanoke, Virginia.

See also
 List of American Football League players

References

1938 births
Living people
American football offensive tackles
American Football League players
Boston Patriots players
Philadelphia Eagles players
Virginia Tech Hokies football players
High school football coaches in Virginia
American Football League All-Star players
Sportspeople from Roanoke, Virginia
Players of American football from Virginia